Sir Edward Crofton, 4th Baronet (12 April 1713 – 26 March 1745) was an Anglo-Irish politician.

Family

Crofton was the son of Sir Edward Crofton, 3rd Baronet and Mary Nixon. He represented Roscommon County in the Irish House of Commons between 1735 and his death in 1745. He succeeded to his father's baronetcy on 11 November 1739. He married Martha Damer, daughter of Joseph Damer and Mary Churchill, on 17 June 1741.

Education

Crofton entered Trinity College, Dublin on 19 May 17300.

Political career

He represented Roscommon County in the Irish House of Commons between 1735 and his death in 1745.

Military career

He served in the British Army and was killed near Tournai during the War of the Austrian Succession. He died without children and was succeeded by his relation, Oliver. The later Crofton Baronets were descendants of Edward's sister Catherine, who married Sir Marcus Lowther-Crofton, 1st Baronet.

Widow's re-marriage

His widow remarried Ezekiel Nisbett, an Irish medical doctor and President of the Royal College of Physicians of Ireland.

References

1713 births
1745 deaths
18th-century Anglo-Irish people
Baronets in the Baronetage of Ireland
British Army personnel of the War of the Austrian Succession
Edward
Irish MPs 1727–1760
Dawson-Damer family